The Ciclone class were a group of torpedo boats or destroyer escorts built for the Italian Navy which fought in the Second World War. They were modified, slightly heavier, versions of the previous Orsa class, with improved stability and heavier anti-submarine armament. These ships were built as part of the Italian war mobilization programme and completed in 1942–43.

Armament
All units were fitted with a sonar, and also torpedo launchers were present in the same quantity and placement for all units of the class.  However, there were three different gun configurations in the class:
 Ghibli, Impavido, Impetuoso, Indomito were fitted with 3 single 100mm/47 guns, plus 4 dual 20mm/65 machine guns.
 Aliseo, Ardente, Ciclone, Fortunale, Groppo, Monsone, Tifone, Uragano with 2 single 100mm/47 guns and 8 × 20mm/65 machine guns.
 Animoso, Ardito, Ardimentoso, Intrepido with 2 single 100mm/47 guns, while the central mounting was fitted with a quadruple 20mm/65 mounting, for a total of 12 AA machine guns.

Ships

History
Units of this class were heavily engaged in escort duties between Italy and Northern Africa, or in anti-submarine patrols. Some units were still incomplete when Italy signed the Armistice of Cassibile, and were sabotaged by the Italians, or captured by the Germans, completed and reclassified as "Torpedoboot Ausland" (Foreign Torpedo-boat).

Aliseo, with Carlo Fecia di Cossato in command, destroyed eight German auxiliary vessels near the port of Bastia, Corsica. For this success, di Cossato was given the highest Italian military decoration, the Gold Medal of Military Valor.

Five units survived the war, to be transferred to the USSR, Greece and Yugoslavia as reparation for war damages. None was left in service with Italian Navy''.

References

External links
 Historical Ships Marina Militare website

 
Torpedo boat classes
World War II torpedo boats of Italy
Ships built in Italy
Torpedo boats of the Regia Marina